Model Wanted is a 1933 Italian "white-telephones" comedy film directed by E. W. Emo and starring Elsa Merlini, Nino Besozzi, and Gianfranco Giachetti. It is the Italian-language version of the German film Marion, That's Not Nice, also directed by Emo.

Cast

References

Bibliography

External links 

1933 films
Italian comedy films
1933 comedy films
1930s Italian-language films
Films directed by E. W. Emo
Italian multilingual films
Films about fictional painters
Films about advertising
Italian black-and-white films
1933 multilingual films
1930s Italian films